The Type 91 Grenade Launcher is a Chinese grenade launcher used to launch 35mm non-lethal grenades. It may come in shoulder-launched, rifle-attached, and vehicle-mounted variants. The rifle mounted version has a similar loading mechanism to the American made M203.

Design and development
The shoulder-fired launcher is a single-shot, manual-fed, and breech-loading weapon. It is lightweight, compact, breech-loading, and single-shot. It consists of a hand guard, sight, aluminum receiver assembly, barrel stop, and firing mechanism. The weapon could be used by any front-line assault troops in need of a long range explosive.

This weapon would be carried as a secondary weapon for a breacher, the member of a team who carries breach tool during an assault. The rifle-attached variant could be mounted on the underside of either a Type 56, Type 81, or QBZ-95.

Grenade types
DFB-91 Stun grenade.
DFT-91 Sting grenade. 
DFR-91 Paintball grenade.
DFC-91 Tear gas.
DFG-91 Flashbang.

Variants 
QLL-91 shoulder-fired variant
QLG-91 rifle-attached variant for Type 56 assault rifle.
QLG-91A rifle-attached variant for Type 81 assault rifle.
QLG-91B rifle-attached variant for QBZ-95

Vehicle-Mounted
This version of the Type 91 can be mounted on the WZ-551 internal security armored vehicle. It can fire in automatic and semi-automatic modes. The launcher is air-cooled, recoil operated, disintegrating metallic link-belt fed non lethal weapon.

Users 
: Used by the People's Liberation Army.

See also
 QLZ-87 grenade launcher
 QLG-10

International:
 M203
 M320

References

External links
 Type 91 at SinoDefence

Weapons of the People's Republic of China
Grenade launchers of the People's Republic of China
Grenade launchers
Riot guns
Teargas grenade guns
Riot control weapons